Brian F. Durkin (born May 17, 1976) is an American actor. He was born in Charlotte, North Carolina and earned a Bachelor of Science degree in building construction from University of Florida in 2000.

In 2019, Durkin joined other WGA members in firing their agents as part of the WGA's stand against the ATA and the practice of packaging.

Filmography

Film

Television

References

External links

Profile at Yahoo! TV

1976 births
Living people
University of Florida alumni
Male actors from North Carolina
21st-century American male actors